Magdalen Street is a short shopping street in central Oxford, England, just north of the original north gate in the city walls. Traditionally, the name of the street is pronounced  and not as the name of the Magdalen College, which is always .

At the southern end, Magdalen Street meets Cornmarket Street continuing to the south, Broad Street to the east and George Street to the west. At the northern end it continues as St Giles' to the north, with Beaumont Street to the west.  
To the west are shops. The street used to be the location of Oxford's leading department store for many years, Elliston & Cavell. It later became a Debenhams store. On the northern corner with Beaumont Street is the Macdonald Randolph Hotel, widely considered to be Oxford's leading hotel.

To the east is a historic church, St Mary Magdalen, originally established in Saxon times. Beyond that is Magdalen Street East  and Balliol College. North of the church is the Martyrs' Memorial, commemorating the Oxford Martyrs.

Thornton's Bookshop opened in Magdalen Street in 1835 and was located here until 1840, and again from 1853 to 1863.

St Giles' Fair, held at the beginning of September each year and mainly in St Giles' to the north, extends into Magdalen Street. During the 1930s, the poet John Betjeman noted that:

It is about the biggest fair in England. The whole of St Giles' and even Magdalen Street by Elliston and Cavell's right up to and beyond the War Memorial, at the meeting of the Woodstock and Banbury roads, is thick with freak shows, roundabouts, cake-walks, the whip, and the witching waves.''

References

Streets in Oxford
Balliol College, Oxford
Shopping streets in Oxford